Sergey Vladilenovich Kiriyenko (né Izraitel; ; born 26 July 1962) is a Russian politician who has served as First Deputy Chief of Staff of the Presidential Administration of Russia since 5 October 2016. Previously he served as the 30th Prime Minister of Russia from 23 March to 23 August 1998 under President Boris Yeltsin. Between 2005 and 2016 he was the head of Rosatom, the state nuclear energy corporation. Kiriyenko was the youngest Prime Minister of Russia, taking the position at age 35.

Early life
Sergei Kiriyenko's grandfather, Yakov Israitel, made his name as a devoted communist and member of the Cheka, and Vladimir Lenin awarded him with an inscribed pistol for his good service to the Communist Party of the Soviet Union.Sergei Kiriyenko, son of a Jewish father, was born in Sukhumi, the capital of the Abkhaz ASSR, and grew up in Sochi, in southern Russia. He adopted the Ukrainian surname of his mother. After graduation from high school, Kiriyenko enrolled in the shipbuilding faculty at the Nizhny Novgorod (Gorky) Water Transport Engineers Institute, where his divorced father taught.

Career

Prime Minister (1998)

Kiriyenko was appointed Prime Minister after the dismissal of Viktor Chernomyrdin's Second Cabinet. The State Duma, dominated by the Communist Party of the Russian Federation, twice refused to confirm his appointment but president Yeltsin nominated him a third time and Kiriyenko was confirmed.

Russians would popularly call the nomination of Kiriyenko "Kinder Surprise", a reference to both the unexpectedness of such an appointment and youth of the prime minister, a nickname used to refer to Sergey Kiriyenko in the critical media nowadays, too. 

Along with Deputy Prime Minister Boris Nemtsov and Anatoly Chubais, Kirienko became known as one of "young reformists". They tried to improve the Russia's economy using International Monetary Fund (IMF) credits, and it elevated the national debt to the level of $22.6 billion.

Kirienko's cabinet defaulted the GKO-OFZ government bond coupons which led to devaluation of the Russian ruble and 1998 Russian financial crisis. Kiriyenko took responsibility for the crisis and resigned on 23 August.

Libel lawsuit
In 2004, Novaya Gazeta printed seven articles by columnist Georgy Rozhnov, which accused Kiriyenko of embezzling US$4.8 billion of IMF funds in 1998 when he was Prime Minister of Russia. The newspaper based the accusations on a letter allegedly written to Colin Powell and signed by US Congressmen Philip Crane, Mike Pence, Charlie Norwood, Dan Burton and Henry Bonilla and posted on the website of the American Defense Council. The newspaper went on to claim that Kiriyenko had used some of the embezzled funds to purchase real estate in the United States. The Moscow newspaper, The eXile, announced it had sent the letter as a prank, but later claimed that this had been a joke. In response, Kiriyenko sued Novaya Gazeta and Rozhnov for libel, and in passing judgement in favour of Kiriyenko the court ordered Novaya Gazeta to retract all publications relating to the accusations. The court noted "Novaya gazeta’s content on the missing IMF funds include a great deal of unproven information" and also went on to order the newspaper "to publish only officially proven information linking Mr Kiriyenko with embezzlement."

Union of Right Forces (1999)

Together with Boris Nemtsov and Irina Hakamada and along with others, Kirienko formed the Union of Right Forces. Kiriyenko led the party in the 1999 legislative election. Party finished fourth on elections, receiving 29 seats. Kiriyenko headed the parliamentary group of the party.

Rosatom (2005–2016)

Kiriyenko was appointed to head Rosatom, the Federal Atomic Energy Agency, on November 30, 2005 by Mikhail Fradkov's Second Cabinet during the second term of President Vladimir Putin. He was also appointed by the same administration to chair the board of directors of the vertically integrated Atomenergoprom nuclear company in July 2007.

Kiriyenko said on 18 September 2006 while in Vienna, that the reactor in the Bushehr nuclear plant in Iran should be operational by September 2007 and the plant itself will be active in November 2007. He advocated President Vladimir Putin's idea of creating an international system of uranium enrichment centers. A uranium enrichment center could be operational in Russia in 2007. Responding to a reporter's question, Kiriyenko said that the Bushehr power plant would not affect nuclear non-proliferation and that there was nothing preventing Iran-Russia energy cooperation. The Government of Russia planned to deliver nuclear fuel to the plant in March 2007. After a delay of some three years, Kiriyenko said 21 August 2010's arrival of nuclear fuel at Iran's Bushehr I marks "an event of crucial importance" that proves that "Russia always fulfills its international obligations."  Spent nuclear fuel from the plant will be sent back to Russia.

Kiriyenko was replaced as General Director of Rosatom on 5 October 2016 by Alexey Likhachev, former Deputy Minister for Economic Development.

It came to light in July 2018 that for his work in Rosatom Kirienko was awarded by a confidential decree a Hero of Russia honorary title.

First deputy chief of staff to President Putin 
In September 2016 Kiriyenko was appointed First deputy chief of staff in Putin's administration.

Kiriyenko spoke publicly about the need to work with Russian youth and their fondness for debauched hip-hop, most notably in response to the crackdown in late 2018.

Vadim Prokhorov, one of his former colleagues, described him as "a very flexible man [ideologically], who will never go against the wind."

Navalny sanctions
While Kiriyenko was in office, he was sanctioned by both the United Kingdom and European Union (amongst the list of six individuals and one organization) on 15 October 2020 over the Alexei Navalny poisoning. Navalny, an opponent of Putin's, was poisoned on 20 August 2020, while travelling on a flight inside Russia.

Sanctions over Ukraine

On February 21, 2022, President Putin officially recognized the Luhansk People's Republic and Donetsk People's Republic as independent from Ukraine, a move that prompted countries to sanction Russian individuals and companies. On February 22, 2022, US President Joe Biden imposed sanctions on Kiriyenko, along with his son Vladimir for their connections to the Russian government.

Administrator of occupied Ukraine

On 5 May 2022 it was reported that Kiriyenko visited the Russian-occupied city of Mariupol, taking part in the unveiling of a statue of an old woman holding the Soviet flag. Kiriyenko said that "Babushka Anya is a symbol of the motherland for the entire" Russian world.

On 6 June Kiriyenko visited occupied Kherson, and it was reported by the Ukrainian mayor of Kherson, Ihor Kolykhaiev, that the occupiers had conducted a meeting of more than 70 Russian sympathizers aimed at conducting a referendum on the region integrating the occupied areas into Russia. Kolykhaev's sources told him that the dates discussed were two: in September or at the end of 2022. A Russian election happens on 11 September and the Kherson vote would be scheduled to coincide that day. An elected official in Russia named Igor Kastyukevich had discussed this plan on 7 June, following the visit of Kiriyenko. By June, the occupiers of Kherson were switching Ukrainian schools to their educational curriculum and Russian SIM cards were on the market. Kolykhaev witnessed the occupiers distributing Russian passports. A cafe frequented by the occupiers was bombed on 7 June and at least four people were injured.

By June 2022 it was reported in by Meduza and Bloomberg News that Kiriyenko was made responsible by Putin for the self-proclaimed "people’s republics" in Donbas and other Russian-occupied territories in Ukraine.

In late 2022, Russian opposition politician Nikita Yuferev accused Kiriyenko of violating Russia's 2022 war censorship laws.

Family
Kiriyenko's son Vladimir was appointed CEO of VKontakte in December 2021, the influential Russian social network after the controversial takeover of VKontakte by companies affiliated with state-owned gas giant Gazprom, in what critics said was a sign of the Kremlin tightening its grip over the social media network. Critics have accused the company of sharing user’s data with Russia’s security services.

See also
Sergei Kiriyenko's Cabinet

References

External links

Federal agency on atomic energy of Russia

1962 births
Living people
People from Sukhumi
Heads of government of the Russian Federation
Third convocation members of the State Duma (Russian Federation)
1st class Active State Councillors of the Russian Federation
Energy ministers of Russia
Union of Right Forces politicians
Russian people of Jewish descent
Russian people of Ukrainian descent
Rosatom
Heroes of the Russian Federation
Russian individuals subject to the U.S. Department of the Treasury sanctions
Russian individuals subject to European Union sanctions
Russian Presidential Academy of National Economy and Public Administration alumni
21st-century Russian politicians